Dapalis is an extinct genus of prehistoric perciform fish.

Species
D. angustus  & Weidmann 1992
D. antipodus  1980
D. bartensteini  1978
D. bhatiai Rana 1996
D. buffetauti Rana 1996
D. cappadocensi Menzel & Becker-Platen 1981
D. carinatus Stinton & Kissling 1968
D. curvirostris
D. formosus
D. macrurus

Distribution
Fossils of species of this genus have been found in the Miocene of Germany and in the Oligocene of France.

See also

 Prehistoric fish
 List of prehistoric bony fish

References

 Bony fish in the online Sepkoski Database
 The Paleobiology Database

Prehistoric perciform genera
Cenozoic fish of Europe
Oligocene fish
Taxa named by Johannes von Nepomuk Franz Xaver Gistel
Serranidae